Pelecocera escorialensis is a species of hoverfly in the family Syrphidae.

Distribution
Spain.

References

Eristalinae
Insects described in 1909
Diptera of Europe
Taxa named by Gabriel Strobl